Gairi Rajputon Ki is a village in Partapnagar Tehsil of the Tehri Garhwal district in the Indian state of  Uttarakhand.

Location
Gairi Rajputon Ki is inhabited by about 180 families.

Demographics 

Gairi Rajputon Ki has a population of 508 males and  627 females (according to the Population Census of 2011), totaling 1135. In 2011, the literacy rate 71.64%, compared to 78.82% for Uttarakhand. Male literacy stood at 94.03%, while females reached 54.63%. The 204 children comprise 17.97% of the total. The average sex ratio is 1234, while Uttarakhand state is 963. The child sex ratio is 925, versus 890 for the state.

Governance 

The village is administered by a Sarpanch (village head), who is its elected representative.

References 

Villages in Tehri Garhwal district